Energy Standard are one of the four founding European teams for the International Swimming League. The team is based in Paris, France and trains out of the Gloria Sports Arena in Belek, Turkey.

The team won each of their matches in the first season of ISL, starting with the first match in Indianapolis, USA then Naples, Italy. They continued their winning streak at the European Derby in London, GBR and took the inaugural championship title in the finale in Las Vegas, USA.

Head coaches
James Gibson (swimmer) (2019-2021)

2019 International Swimming League season

Team roster 
ISL teams had a maximum roster of 32 athletes for 2019 season, with a suggested size of each club's traveling roster of 28 (14 men and 14 women). Each club had a captain and a vice-captain of different gender. Energy Standard had the most culturally diverse team of the league with athletes from 14 different countries representing the program.

Match results 
In the 2019 (inaugural) ISL season, Energy Standard maintained an undefeated 4-0 record. Team co-captain, Sarah Sjöström was named season MVP after amassing 243.5 points.

2020 International Swimming League season 
During the winter of 2020 Energy Standard announced various signees to their roster for the planned second ISL season, including Felipe Lima, Pernille Blume, Jeremy Desplanches, Siobhan Haughey and Zsuzsanna Jakabos.

References 

Sports clubs in Paris
Swimming clubs in France
International Swimming League
Swimming in France